Khatunabad (also Romanized as Khātūnābād) is a village in Zahray-ye Bala Rural District, in the Central District of Buin Zahra County, Qazvin Province, Iran. At the 2006 census, its population was 751, in 186 families.

References 

Populated places in Buin Zahra County